The Pseudoxyrhophiidae is a family of elapoid snakes, found mostly in Madagascar. They were formerly placed as a subfamily of the Lamprophiidae, but have been more recently identified as a distinct family.

It contains about 22 genera in two subfamilies:
Amplorhininae Meirte, 1992
Amplorhinus 
Ditypophis 
Duberria 
Pseudoxyrhophiinae Dowling, 1975
Alluaudina 
Brygophis 
Compsophis 
Dromicodryas 
Elapotinus 
Heteroliodon 
Ithycyphus 
Langaha 
Leioheterodon 
Liophidium 
Liopholidophis 
Lycodryas 
Madagascarophis 
Micropisthodon 
Pararhadinaea 
Parastenophis 
Phisalixella 
Pseudoxyrhopus 
Thamnosophis

References 

Pseudoxyrhophiidae